Bazargah (also Romanized as Bāzārgāh; also known as Bāzārgeh) is a village in Padena-ye Olya Rural District, Padena District, Semirom County, Isfahan Province, Iran. At the 2006 census, its population was 286, in 58 families.

References 

Populated places in Semirom County